{{Speciesbox
| image = Haemophilus_ducreyi_01.jpg
| image_caption = Photomicrograph of H. ducreyi
| taxon = Haemophilus ducreyi| authority = (Neveu-Lemaire, 1921)Bergey et al. 1923
}}Haemophilus ducreyi is a fastidious gram-negative coccobacillus bacteria. 

It causes the sexually transmitted disease chancroid, a major cause of genital ulceration in developing countries characterized by painful sores on the genitalia. Chancroid starts as an erythematous papular lesion that breaks down into a painful bleeding ulcer with a necrotic base and ragged edge. More recently, it has also been found to cause chronic skin ulceration away from the genitalia, infect children and adults, and behave in a manner that mimics yaws. These strains seem to have diverged quite recently.H. ducreyi can be cultured on chocolate agar. It is best treated with a macrolide, e.g. azithromycin, and a third-generation cephalosporin, e.g. ceftriaxone. H. ducreyi gram stain resembles a "school of fish."

PathogenesisH. ducreyi is an opportunistic microorganism that infects its host by way of breaks in the skin or epidermis. Inflammation then takes place as the area of infection is inundated with lymphocytes, macrophages, and granulocytes. This pyogenic inflammation causes regional lymphadenitis in the sexually transmitted disease chancroid.

 Diagnosis 
Although antigen detection, serology, and genetic amplification methods are sometimes used to diagnose infections with H. ducreyi and the genetic tests have greater sensitivity, they are not widely available, so cultures are currently considered the "gold standard" test.

Treatment
The first line treatments are one of four options : azithromycin 1 g orally in a single dose, ceftriaxone 250 mg intramuscularly in a single dose, ciprofloxacin 500 mg orally 2 times a day for 3 days, or erythromycin base 500 mg orally 3 times a day for 7 days. 

 See also 
 Sexually transmitted disease

 References 

External links
 Haemophilus ducreyi at the NCBI Taxonomy Browser
 Type strain of Haemophilus ducreyi at BacDive'', the Bacterial Diversity Metadatabase

ducreyi
Bacteria described in 1923
Taxa named by Maurice Neveu-Lemaire